Bolívar is a village in Canelones Department, Uruguay.

Geography

Location

History
On 4 February 1886, it was declared a "Pueblo" (village) by Decree.

Population
In 2011 Bolívar had a population of 139.
 
Source: Instituto Nacional de Estadística de Uruguay

References

External links
INE map of Bolívar

Populated places in the Canelones Department